Document Number Nine (or Document No. 9), more properly the Communiqué on the Current State of the Ideological Sphere (also translated as the Briefing on the Current Situation in the Ideological Realm), is a confidential internal document widely circulated within the Chinese Communist Party (CCP) in 2013 by the General Office of the CCP. The document was first circulated in July 2012. The document warns of seven dangerous Western values, allegedly including media freedom and judicial independence. Teaching on any of the seven topics is forbidden. There is an emphasis on controlling and preventing communication using the internet of ideas subversive to one party rule. The document was issued in the context of planned economic reforms and increased calls for political reform. It has been described as a critique of the "liberal ways of thinking".

The document was not made available to public by the Communist Party or any branches of the Chinese government, but in July 2013 was allegedly leaked by Chinese dissident journalist Gao Yu, who was in turn sentenced to a seven-year imprisonment for "leaking state secrets".

It is unclear whether this document is official Chinese policy or just a faction within the party. However, The New York Times suggests that it "bears the unmistakable imprimatur of Xi Jinping". It is thought that Document No. 9 was issued by the General Office of the Central Committee, and would have required the approval of CCP General Secretary Xi Jinping and other top leaders.

Name
The document has been described as a communiqué or circular. The name of the document (Document Number Nine), as it came to be commonly referred in Western English-language press, comes from the fact that it was the ninth such document issued that year in China.

Contents
The document is highly critical of what can be broadly described as "Western values" (the document itself uses terms such as "Western values", "Western principles", "Western standards", "Western ideas", and more precisely, "Western constitutional democracy" and "Western-style theories of governance", as well as making references to "Western anti-China forces"). The document is critical of "extremely malicious" ideals spreading in the Chinese society, such as ideas of (Western) constitutional democracy, civil society, universal values (freedom, democracy, and human rights), neo-liberalism, and freedom of the press (described as the "Western news values"). The document warns that such subjects undermine the CCP's control over Chinese society. The document also promotes ways of dealing with these problems, which include "Unwavering adherence to the principle of the Party's control of media."

Prelude 
The prelude to this document references a previous article of 2012 and raises six challenges faced by China in asserting control over its ideology, while also identifying various routes by which Western hostile forces might subvert Chinese ideology.

 The cultural penetration of Western hostile forces threatens the security of our ideology. There are three main ways of cultural penetration:
 The first is direct cultural propaganda, that is, the use of modern media for long-term ideological penetration.
 The second is to use cultural commodities as a carrier to infiltrate the various values of the West into the public. (Cultural commodities refers to movies, novels, commercial goods, and other commodities which might be subverted by Western hostile forces.)
 The third is to infiltrate Western values into social elites such as high-level scholars and intellectuals under the cover of educational and academic exchanges. 
 Various social thoughts aim to hinder or subvert the authoritative identification of China's mainstream ideology.
 The collapse of the Soviet Union and the fall of communism in Eastern Europe have undermined belief in China's mainstream ideology.
 The theme of development and the goal of modernization have played down the opposition between ideologies. (i.e. opposition between the Western system of liberal democracy and the Chinese system of "socialism with Chinese characteristics", which by implication are irrevocably opposed.)
 Diverse value orientations have a negative impact on China's mainstream ideology.
 Information networking poses a challenge to the control of our ideology.

The Seven Noteworthy Problems
The document specifically addresses the following issues that were seen as problems.  These are the terms used in the document itself:
 Promoting Western Constitutional Democracy: An attempt to undermine the current leadership and the "socialism with Chinese characteristics" system of governance.  (Including the separation of powers, the multi-party system, general elections, and independent judiciaries.)
 Promoting “universal values” in an attempt to weaken the theoretical foundations of the Party's leadership.  (That “the West’s values are the prevailing norm for all human civilization”, that “only when China accepts Western values will it have a future”.)
 Promoting civil society in an attempt to dismantle the ruling party's social foundation.  (i.e. that individual rights are paramount and ought to be immune to obstruction by the state.)
 Promoting neoliberalism, attempting to change China's basic economic system. (i.e. "unrestrained economic liberalization, complete privatization, and total marketization".)
 Promoting the West's idea of journalism, challenging China's principle that the media and publishing system should be subject to Party discipline.
 Promoting historical nihilism, trying to undermine the history of the CPC and of New China.  (For example to deny the scientific and guiding value of Mao Zedong thought.)
 Questioning Reform and Opening and the socialist nature of socialism with Chinese characteristics.  (For example, saying “We have deviated from our Socialist orientation.”)

Leak
The contents of the memo became known when accounts of presenting it to cadre in the Liaoyuan municipal government were published in the local paper. In May 2013, cadre at the Chongqing Party Committee for Urban and Rural Construction studied the material, as did cadre in Anyang. However, there were no explicit mentions of the seven Western values above.

In April 2015, the Wall Street Journal's Josh Chin  reported a 71-year-old Chinese journalist was convicted for releasing Document 9.  Journalist Gao Yu was sentenced to seven years in prison by Beijing's Third Intermediate People's Court after being found guilty in a closed trial of leaking state secrets to foreign media. Ms Gao was accused by the court of leaking an internal Communist Party directive to an overseas Chinese news site in 2013, according to her lawyer, Mo Shaoping.  Historically, it is rare for Chinese authorities to detain or jail elderly critics, who were traditionally given quiet warnings when they crossed political red lines. The article suggests that the charge is a pretext for aggressive action against political dissent and cites other examples of elderly publishers and journalists being prosecuted.

Analysis
According to news analysis by a reporter at The New York Times, the emphasis on political discipline is intended to forestall leftist, or Maoist, opposition to needed economic reforms avoiding the split which resulted in the Soviet Union during Gorbachev's reform efforts when media freedom resulted in publishing of a great deal of critical historical material and alienation of the mass of party workers.

See also 
 Silent Contest

References

External links

2013 in China
2013 documents
Classified documents
Xi Jinping
Chinese Communist Party
Censorship in China